Mangina is a city in Beni Territory in the North Kivu province of the Democratic Republic of the Congo. As of 2012, it had an estimated population of 39,351.

References 

Populated places in North Kivu